Daniel James Mandla Ncayiyana is a South African obstetrician and gynaecologist who was Editor-in-Chief of the South African Medical Journal for twenty years.

References

Living people
South African obstetricians
Academic staff of the University of Cape Town
Year of birth missing (living people)